Longwood Township is an inactive township in Pettis County, in the U.S. state of Missouri.

Longwood Township takes its name from the community of Longwood, Missouri.

References

Townships in Missouri
Townships in Pettis County, Missouri